The 1970 Atlanta Falcons season was the franchise's fifth year in the National Football League (NFL). The team failed to improve on their previous season's output of 6–8, winning only four games. They failed to reach the playoffs for the fifth straight season. The team began its season by winning two of its first three games. However, following their 21–20 win over the San Francisco 49ers the Falcons went 2–7–2 in their final 11 games. The Falcons are the most recent NFL to have tie games in two straight weeks..

Offseason

NFL Draft

Personnel

Staff

Roster

Regular season

Schedule

Note: Intra-division opponents are in bold text.

Standings

References

External links
 1970 Atlanta Falcons at Pro-Football-Reference.com

Atlanta Falcons seasons
Atlanta Falcons
Atlanta